Calumet City is a city in Cook County, Illinois, United States. The population was 36,033 at the 2020 census, a decline of 2.7% from 37,042 in 2010. The ZIP code is 60409.

Etymology
The word Calumet is the Miꞌkmaq and French word for a Ceremonial pipe as used by Native Americans.

History
Calumet City (commonly referred to locally as "Cal City") was founded in 1893 when the villages of Schrumville and Sobieski Park merged under the name of West Hammond, since it lies on the west side of the Illinois-Indiana line from Hammond, Indiana. In 1924, West Hammond officially became Calumet City after its citizens voted to change the name in 1923.

Geography

Surrounding areas
In addition to being bordered to the east by Hammond, it is also bordered by Burnham and Chicago to the north, Lansing to the south, and South Holland and Dolton to the west.
 Chicago / Burnham
 Dolton    Hammond
 Dolton / South Holland   Hammond
 South Holland    Munster
 Lansing

Demographics

As of the 2020 census there were 36,033 people, 14,166 households, and 8,607 families residing in the city. The racial makeup of the city was 72.64% African American, 9.74% White, 0.65% Native American, 0.19% Asian, 0.04% Pacific Islander, 10.44% from other races, and 6.30% from two or more races. Hispanic or Latino of any race were 17.97% of the population.

There were 14,166 households, out of which 49.14% had children under the age of 18 living with them, 26.65% were married couples living together, 26.42% had a female householder with no husband present, and 39.24% were non-families. 36.79% of all households were made up of individuals, and 16.50% had someone living alone who was 65 years of age or older. The average household size was 3.38 and the average family size was 2.56.

The city's age distribution consisted of 23.5% under the age of 18, 11.0% from 18 to 24, 26.1% from 25 to 44, 26% from 45 to 64, and 13.5% who were 65 years of age or older. The median age was 36.9 years. For every 100 females, there were 81.9 males. For every 100 females age 18 and over, there were 75.9 males.

The median income for a household in the city was $50,640, and the median income for a family was $55,612. Males had a median income of $34,474 versus $32,079 for females. The per capita income for the city was $23,688. About 15.9% of families and 18.4% of the population were below the poverty line, including 29.6% of those under age 18 and 10.9% of those age 65 or over.

Note: the US Census treats Hispanic/Latino as an ethnic category. This table excludes Latinos from the racial categories and assigns them to a separate category. Hispanics/Latinos can be of any race.

Arts and culture
A landmark and point of pride among Cal City residents is the pair of large water towers painted like the popular "Have a Nice Day" smiley faces which are located on Ring Road near River Oaks Mall, the other State Street near Interstate 94.

Government
Calumet City has a Mayor-Council type government.

The city has 7 Wards.

Calumet City is in Illinois's 2nd congressional district.

The mayor of Calumet City is currently Thaddeus Jones. He has served as Mayor since being elected to the office in 2021.

Education
Calumet City is served by several elementary school districts:
Calumet City School District 155
Woodrow Wilson Memorial School
Wentworth Intermediate School
Wentworth Jr. High School
Dolton School District 149
Berger Vandenberg School
Carol Moseley Braun School
Caroline Sibley School
Dirksen Middle School
Lincoln Elementary School District 156
Lincoln Elementary School
Hoover-Schrum Memorial School District No. 157
Hoover Elementary School
Schrum Memorial Middle School

The city is served by two high school districts:
Thornton Township High School District 205 (west of Torrence Avenue)
Thornwood High School
Thornton Fractional High School District 215 (east of Torrence Avenue)
Thornton Fractional North High School

Notable people 

 Landon Cox, drafted to Cincinnati Bengals, July 28, 2011
 Arline M. Fantin, Illinois state representative
 Frank Giglio, Illinois state representative
 John Jurkovic, defensive lineman for several NFL teams; radio host at ESPN Radio 1000
 Mirko Jurkovic, former offensive guard for the Chicago Bears and All-American at the University of Notre Dame
 Alan Keyes (born 1950), conservative political activist and perennial candidate. Keyes moved from Maryland to Calumet City to establish residency after being drafted by the Illinois Republican Party to run against Barack Obama in the 2004 United States Senate election.
 Gene Krupa, jazz drummer, buried in Holy Cross Cemetery
 José Olivarez, poet, author of Citizen Illegal and Promises of Gold. Editor of The Breakbeat Poets Volume 4: LatiNext.
 DJ Rashad, Chicago house music producer
 Mike Tomczak, quarterback for several NFL teams, including the 1985 Chicago Bears Super Bowl champions
 Steve Wojciechowski, former pitcher for the Oakland Athletics
 Tink, singer-songwriter
 Tim Walberg (born 1951), member of the United States House of Representatives from Michigan. His family moved from Chicago to Calumet City and he attended Thornton Fractional Township North High School.

In popular culture

Calumet City is featured or mentioned in a number of major movies. John Belushi's "Joliet Jake" and Dan Aykroyd's "Elwood" characters from The Blues Brothers were born in Calumet City, and so is the orphanage they grew up in, which they save "on a mission from God" by paying $5,000 in property taxes from a $10,000 record deal at their concert, as well as "Ray's Music Exchange" that holds the famed Ray Charles "Shake Your Tail-Feather" scene of the movie. In the book and film The Silence of the Lambs, Buffalo Bill is thought to be hiding in Calumet City, when he is actually in Belvedere, Ohio. The Calumet City scenes in the film were filmed in Pittsburgh, Pennsylvania, however. Lily Tomlin's prim but assertive housewife/spokesperson "Mrs. Judith Beasley" is said to be a resident of Calumet City. She said, "Hi. I am not an actress, but a real person like yourself."

Calumet City is also referenced by a number of popular music acts. The Black Crowes included a video of the Smiley Towers in their 1990 video for "Hard to Handle". A photograph of the "Dolton" smiley water tower is featured on the back of the Dead Kennedys album Plastic Surgery Disasters. Rapper Twista has referenced Calumet City. Kanye West's reference to Calumet in his 2005 song "Drive Slow" does not refer to Calumet City, but rather to Calumet High School, which was located in the South Side of Chicago and not in Calumet City.

The Smiley Tower is also featured in the movie Natural Born Killers; it is seen out the window of Mallory's family home (part of that movie was filmed in Hammond, Indiana). In the Nine Inch Nails music video on the director's cut of the same film, the Smiley Tower and Dolton Avenue/State Street is featured.

The founders of the Calumet Baking Powder Company adopted its brand name from the original Native American word for the land that became Calumet City. They later named one of thoroughbred horse racing's most famed and successful enterprises, Calumet Farm, after the company.

In 2004, Alan Keyes purchased a raised ranch house in Calumet City to establish residency in Illinois so he could run for the U.S. Senate in place of Jack Ryan against Barack Obama, although instead of residing in the house, he officially moved into an apartment elsewhere in town, on Garfield Avenue.

In 2010, pop music group Hanson remade the "Shake Your Tailfeather" scene from The Blues Brothers for the music video for their hit "Thinkin' 'Bout Somethin'" in Tulsa, Oklahoma, paying homage to Calumet City's Ray's Music Exchange, John Belushi, and Ray Charles.

Jean Shepherd (writer and narrator of the classic movie A Christmas Story) in radio broadcasts from WOR radio, New York in the 1950s, 1960s and 1970s and in his PBS specials of the 1970s and 1980s, and his many books, often refers to it as Cal City or just Calumet. He grew up next door in Hammond, Indiana.

References

External links

Calumet City official website
 

 
Chicago metropolitan area
Cities in Illinois
Cities in Cook County, Illinois
Populated places established in 1892
1892 establishments in Illinois
Majority-minority cities and towns in Cook County, Illinois